Carpool Karaoke is a recurring segment on The Late Late Show with James Corden, in which host James Corden invites famous musical guests to sing along to their songs with him whilst traveling in a car driven by Corden on a planned route usually in Los Angeles, usually under the pretense of needing to get to work and preferring to use the high-occupancy carpool vehicle lane, or the pretext of needing directions from a local when in a new town, such as London (with Adele), Liverpool (with Paul McCartney), New York City (with Madonna) or Las Vegas (with Celine Dion).

In 2016, Apple Music and CBS Television Studios announced that they had reached a deal for an exclusive first-window licensing agreement under which Apple Music will be the global home of a television series adaptation of the segment. It was also initially announced that the series would have a host that would appear in every episode. On January 9, 2017, it was reported that the series would not feature a single host and instead would have a different host in every episode.

Origin
The format was created in 2009 by Robert Llewelyn in his podcast series Carpool. Corden argues the segment was inspired by a Gavin & Stacey-themed sketch he had participated in for the British charity television special Red Nose Day 2011, in which he sang along with George Michael in a car.

For the 2014 documentary When Corden Met Barlow which aired on BBC One, Corden included a 6-minute 45 second Carpool Karaoke segment in the documentary with singer-songwriter Gary Barlow of Take That. The documentary was directed by Ben Winston. Corden explained that "Ben Winston and I always thought there was something very joyful about someone very, very famous singing their songs in an ordinary situation. We just had this idea: Los Angeles, traffic, the carpool lane—maybe this is something we could pull off." No musicians were interested initially, but when Corden showed the George Michael-clip to Mariah Carey, she agreed to pioneer the show.

In 2020, it was revealed that Corden does not always actually drive the vehicle during filming; instead it is towed. Corden explained that due to safety issues—like for a dance routine, or costume change—they have to tow, and cited five instances, roughly five percent of the series to date, where this method was employed: with Meghan Trainor, Migos, Cardi B, Chance the Rapper, and Justin Bieber (3rd time). He also added that the entire endeavor is strictly for entertainment as he is already at work and does not need to carpool, and the streets he drives do not have carpool lanes.

Guests
The segments, which have featured artists such as Paul McCartney, Adele, Migos, Nicki Minaj, Cardi B, Mariah Carey, Celine Dion, Justin Bieber, Madonna, Bruno Mars, Billie Eilish, the Foo Fighters, the Jonas Brothers, Nick Jonas, Coldplay, Lady Gaga, Jennifer Lopez, Kanye West, Britney Spears, Stevie Wonder, Demi Lovato, Ariana Grande, Katy Perry, Selena Gomez, BTS, One Direction, Shawn Mendes, Harry Styles, Ed Sheeran, Sia, Elton John, Carrie Underwood and the Red Hot Chili Peppers, became popular videos on the Late Late Shows YouTube channel. A January 2016 Carpool Karaoke segment featuring Adele amassed 42 million YouTube views within five days, making it the most popular video originating from a late night program since 2013, continuing on to gather 233 million by March 12, 2021. , five other segments have amassed over 100 million views on YouTube: One Direction at 176 million, Justin Bieber's first visit at 155 million views, Sia at 140 million, Bruno Mars at 132 million and Selena Gomez at 110 million. , the most viewed segment featuring a non-musician, then US First Lady Michelle Obama (eventually joined by Missy Elliott for one song) has amassed over 80 million views.

On March 29, 2016, CBS aired a primetime special featuring highlights of the segment, and a new edition with Jennifer Lopez. The special won a 2016 Emmy Award for Outstanding Variety Special. The Red Hot Chili Peppers appeared on the June 13, 2016 segment. During the filming, singer Anthony Kiedis saved the life of a baby. Kiedis later said, "A woman came out of her house, holding a child, saying, 'My baby, my baby, my baby can't breathe!' We all ran across the street, the woman thrust the baby into my arms, the baby was not breathing and I thought, 'I'm gonna try and do a little baby CPR real quick, see if I can get some air in this kid.' Tried to open the mouth, [it was] like locked shut. So I started rubbing the belly, bubbles came out of the mouth, the eyes rolled back into place, the ambulance showed up and I handed the baby over, who was now breathing and fine, and we went back to Carpool Karaoke."

List of segments

2015

2016

2017

2018

2019

2020

2021

2022

2023

The Late Late Show Primetime Special
Special broadcasts on prime time (10 pm) highlighting the Carpool Karaoke segment of The Late Late Show. The first show broadcast on March 29, 2016, on CBS won the Primetime Emmy Awards 2016 for "Outstanding Variety Special" category.

Influence
Spike launched a series inspired by the segment that premiered on Apple TV on January 12, 2017. Titled Caraoke Showdown, it was hosted by Craig Robinson, and tasked passengers with competing in different karaoke-style challenges while on a car trip.

In Sweden, Nanne Grönvall performed in the Melodifestivalen 2020 song contest with a song titled "Carpool Karaoke", whose lyrics discussed how she wanted to sing with Corden on his show.

Apple Music series

In 2016, Apple Music announced that it would distribute a TV series, based on Corden's segment, called Carpool Karaoke: The Series. The series premiered on August 8, 2017, with new episodes each Wednesday, available to Apple Music subscribers. It was renewed for a second season in February 2018 and a third season in July 2019.

International versions

See also
 List of The Late Late Show with James Corden episodes
 Carpool

References

The Late Late Show with James Corden
Sing-along television shows
Television shows remade overseas
Non-American television series based on American television series